The Increased Difficulty of Concentration is a play by Václav Havel.  The English translation is by Štěpán Šimek. It is a metaphysical farce, in which Hummel, an academic, juggles lovers, philosophy, and the questions from a strange machine called Pazuk, while trying to make sense of his life.

It was originally performed in 1969 in Prague at the Theatre on the Balustrade.  It eventually won an Obie for its production at Lincoln Center.

External links
The Increased Difficulty of Concentration | Introduction Theater 61 Press website

References

Plays by Václav Havel
1969 plays